Longhurst Plateau is a narrow, snow-covered extension of the Antarctic polar plateau located just west of Mount Longhurst. The plateau was traversed by the Darwin Glacier Party of the Commonwealth Trans-Antarctic Expedition in 1957–58, who named it for nearby Mount Longhurst.

See also
Finn Spur

References

Plateaus of Oates Land